Vanda hindsii, commonly known as the native strap orchid or the Cape York vanda, is a large epiphytic or lithophytic clump-forming orchid. It has thick, white, cord-like roots, branching stems, many thick, leathery, strap-like leaves and between three and seven shiny brown flowers with greenish to yellow markings and a white labellum. This orchid occurs in New Guinea and tropical North Queensland.

Description 
Flowering mainly occurs from November to March.

Taxonomy and naming
Vanda hindsii was first formally described in 1843 by John Lindley and the description was published in the London Journal of Botany from a specimen collected by Richard Brinsley Hinds. The specific epithet (hindsii) honours the collector of the type specimen.

Distribution and habitat
The native strap orchid grows on trees and rocks in humid forests. It only occurs in New Guinea, the Solomon Islands and Queensland where it is found in the Carron Valley, Iron Range and McIlwraith Range.

Conservation status
The global assessment of the conservation status of this orchid in the IUCN Red List of Threatened Species is "least concern", but it is listed as "vulnerable" in Australia under the Australian Government Environment Protection and Biodiversity Conservation Act 1999 and the Queensland Government Nature Conservation Act 1992.

References

hindsii
Orchids of Queensland
Orchids of New Guinea
Plants described in 1843
Epiphytic orchids
Lithophytic orchids